Jonathan Berman is an American film producer, director, screenwriter, and academic. He is best known for his documentary work as producer and film director of The Shvitz (1993), My Friend Paul (1999), Commune (2005), and Calling All Earthlings (2018). His non-fiction feature films explore subculture and identity, depicting how alternative people, groups and ideas are represented in media. Berman currently serves as a Professor at California State University San Marcos.

Biography
Jonathan Berman was born in Brooklyn, NY and raised in Merrick, New York. His father, Herb Berman was a veteran of World War II and a community newspapers publisher in Brooklyn. Berman graduated from McGill University in Montreal with a B.A. degree and received an M.F.A. from Bard College.

Beginnings
Berman began his film career in 1986, when he joined as an assistant film editor and production assistant several entertainment, art and documentary projects in New York including Pee-wee's Playhouse (1987), Costa Rica: A Child in the Wind and The Toxic Avenger Part II (1989).

Filmmaking career
His directorial debut, The Shvitz (1993) was a 16mm black and white documentary depicting traditions revolving around the steambaths once popular in the Eastern European enclaves in New York. The project was supported by the National Endowment for the Arts. The next documentary film, My Friend Paul (1999), observed the nexus of mental illness, friendship, and crime and was one of the first films that ITVS, a division of US Public TV, produced on the subject of mental illness. It has been broadcast on networks worldwide, including US PBS, the Sundance Channel, Planète+, and Netflix. In 1999, Berman co-wrote the story with director Bruno de Almeida for the independent comedy feature On The Run starring Sopranos regulars Michael Imperioli and John Ventimiglia. His documentary Commune (2006) explores an archetypal 1960s California commune, the Black Bear Ranch, which discover that the path to utopia is fraught with struggle. The film opened numerous festivals (Munich, Jerusalem, Karlovy Vary), played on TV (Sundance Channel, BBC, others worldwide), and received positive reviews from the New York Times, Variety, and other publications. His fourth film, Calling All Earthlings (2018) examines California High Desert's UFO counterculture cult and Integratron, a structure near Landers, California built by George Van Tassel. The film gained critical acclaim from a number of media sources including Newsweek and the Boston Globe.

Filmography

References

External links
 

American documentary filmmakers
American film producers
American screenwriters
McGill University alumni
Bard College alumni
Living people
Year of birth missing (living people)